Raphidia is a genus of snakefly, mainly found in Europe.

Species
The following are included in BioLib.cz:
subgenus Aserbeidshanoraphidia Aspöck & Aspöck, 1968
 Raphidia nuchensis H. Aspöck et al., 1968
subgenus Nigroraphidia Aspöck & Aspöck, 1968
 Raphidia friederikae H. Aspöck & U. Aspöck, 1967
 Raphidia palaeformis H. Aspöck & U. Aspöck, 1964
subgenus Raphidia Linnaeus, 1758 
 Raphidia alcoholica H. Aspöck & U. Aspöck, 1970
 Raphidia ambigua H. Aspöck & U. Aspöck, 1964
 Raphidia ariadne H. Aspöck & U. Aspöck, 1964
 Raphidia beieri H. Aspöck & U. Aspöck, 1964
 Raphidia euxina Navás, 1915
 Raphidia grusinica H. Aspöck et al., 1968
 Raphidia huettingeri H. Aspöck & U. Aspöck, 1970
 Raphidia kimminsi H. Aspöck & U. Aspöck, 1964
 Raphidia ligurica (Albarda, 1891)
 Raphidia mysia H. Aspöck et al., 1991
 Raphidia ophiopsis Linnaeus, 1758
 Raphidia peterressli H. Aspöck & U. Aspöck, 1973
 Raphidia ulrikae H. Aspöck, 1964
subgenus not placed
 Raphidia armeniaca Hagen, 1867
 Raphidia bavarica Hagen, 1867
 Raphidia communis Retzius, 1783
 Raphidia duomilia Yang, 1998
 Raphidia immaculata Donovan, 1800
 Raphidia mongolica Navás, 1915
 Raphidia taurica Hagen, 1867

Footnotes

References
 

Raphidioptera
Insects of Europe